Bendik Ramsfjell (born 1995) is a Norwegian curler. He plays second on the two-time Norwegian championship Magnus Ramsfjell team from Trondheim.

Curling career
Ramsfjell was the third on the Norwegian junior men's team at the 2016 and 2017 World Junior Curling Championships on teams skipped by his cousin Magnus. At the 2016 World Juniors, the team finished 5th, with a 5–4 round robin record, missing the playoffs. At the 2017 World Juniors, the team improved to a 6-3 round robin record, which put them in a tiebreaker game against Canada's Tyler Tardi rink for the final playoff spot. They beat Canada in the tiebreaker game, but lost to Scotland's Cameron Bryce in the 3 vs. 4 game. This put them in the bronze medal game, where they faced Scotland again. This time, they would beat the Scots to claim the bronze medal. Also in 2017, the team won a bronze medal at the Norwegian Men's Curling Championship.

In 2019, Ramsfjell played second on Team Norway at the 2019 Winter Universiade, on a team skipped by Magnus Ramsfjell. The team went on to win the gold medal.

The Magnus Ramsfjell rink, with Bendik throwing lead stones won the 2020 Norwegian men's championship. The team won the Norwegian championship again in 2022 with Magnus throwing second stones. The team was chosen to represent Norway at the 2022 World Men's Curling Championship, where they finished in 10th with a 5–7 record. That season, the team also won the 2021 Prague Classic World Curling Tour event.

References

External links
 Profile on CurlingZone
 World Curling Federation Profile

Living people
1995 births
Norwegian male curlers
Universiade medalists in curling
Universiade gold medalists for Norway
Competitors at the 2019 Winter Universiade
21st-century Norwegian people